Kayoko is a feminine Japanese given name. Notable people with the name include:

Kayoko Kawahigashi (born 1958), Japanese world champion table tennis player 
Kayoko Fukushi (born 1982), Japanese long-distance runner
Kayoko Kishimoto (born 1960), Japanese actress
Kayoko Fujii (born 1961), Japanese actress and voice actress
, Japanese tennis player
Kayoko Haruyama (born 1979), Japanese professional wrestler
Kayoko Obata (born 1971), Japanese long-distance runner from Japan
Kayoko Okubo, (born 1971) Japanese comedian
Kayoko Shibata (born 1980), Japanese actress, singer, and model
Kayoko Sugiyama (born 1961), Japanese Olympic volleyball player
Kayoko Hayashi, Japanese voice actress
Kayoko Shimizu, member of Liberal Democratic Party and Environment Agency Director General
Kayoko Fukuoka, Japanese tennis player

Fictional characters
Kayoko Kotohiki, a character in Battle Royale

Japanese feminine given names